Score is the debut album by American jazz trumpeter Randy Brecker recorded in 1969 and originally released on the Solid State label.

Songs

The song The Weasel Goes Out to Lunch is an arrangement of the traditional song Pop Goes the Weasel but adapted with dissonant harmony suggesting a style of Avant-garde jazz inspired by the 1964 album Out to Lunch! by Eric Dolphy.

Reception

The Allmusic review by Steve Loewy stated: "The tunes alternate between jazz-rock (a style the Brecker Brothers were later to successfully exploit) and modern mainstream jazz. There are the customary fades, popular at the time, and a light, though constant, beat throughout that makes the music both accessible and even danceable, an impressive feat considering that virtually all the tunes are originals.  ... With well-constructed arrangements, strong soloing, and catchy melodies, Brecker knew he was onto something, and this album was the first of several successful ventures".

Track listing
All compositions by Randy Brecker except where noted
 "Bangalore" – 4:34
 "Score" (Hal Galper) – 7:17
 "Name Game" (Galper) – 5:14
 "The Weasel Goes Out to Lunch" (Traditional) – 1:21
 "Morning Song" – 4:09
 "Pipe Dream" – 4:33
 "The Vamp" (Galper) – 5:14
 "The Marble Sea" – 5:44

Personnel
Randy Brecker – trumpet, flugelhorn, arranger
Michael Brecker – tenor saxophone
Jerry Dodgion – alto flute
Larry Coryell – guitar 
Hal Galper – piano, electric piano, arranger
Eddie Gómez – bass 
Chuck Rainey – Fender bass
Bernard Purdie, Mickey Roker - drums

References 

Solid State Records (jazz label) albums
Randy Brecker albums
1969 albums
Albums produced by Duke Pearson
Albums recorded at Van Gelder Studio